The AWA International Heavyweight Championship, originally known as the CWA/AWA International Heavyweight Championship (also identified as the Mid-Southern International Championship and the AWA International Championship) was a major professional wrestling title defended in the Continental Wrestling Association. It was created in 1983 from the CWA's partnership with the American Wrestling Association. The title lasted until 1987, when it was unified with the NWA Mid-America Heavyweight and AWA Southern Heavyweight championships, creating the CWA Heavyweight Championship.

Title history

See also
AWA Superstars of Wrestling International Heavyweight Championship
CWA Heavyweight Championship
NWA International Heavyweight Championship
WCW International World Heavyweight Championship
WWF International Heavyweight Championship

References

External links
CWA International Heavyweight Championship history – Wrestling-Titles.com
Mid-South Coliseum results – ProWrestlingHistory.com
AWA International Heavyweight Championship history – Wrestling Information Archive

American Wrestling Association championships
Continental Wrestling Association championships
Heavyweight wrestling championships
International professional wrestling championships